Hart Mountain is a fault-block mountain, in Lake County, Oregon, U.S. It lies about  to the east of Lakeview.

It is sometimes confused with a mountain range, but is more properly described as a mountain. The two highest peaks are Warner Peak and Hart Peak.

Hart Mountain is named for the heart-shaped brand used by the pioneer ranchers Henry C. Wilson and his son-in-law C.G. Alexander.  Their ranch was located in the Warner Valley at the base of Hart Mountain.

The top of the mountain is part of the Hart Mountain National Antelope Refuge, with pronghorn antelope and bighorn sheep. At the western base of the mountain lies the Warner Wetlands ACEC, a reserve managed by the Bureau of Land Management and home to waterfowl and other wildlife. A trail leads half a mile into the wetlands to a hide.

References

External links
 "Hart Mountain National Antelope Refuge general reference map".
 

Mountains of Oregon
Mountains of Lake County, Oregon